"The Stock Tip" is the fifth episode (and season finale) of the first season of the NBC sitcom Seinfeld.

It aired on June 21, 1990. In the episode, George Costanza (Jason Alexander) tells Jerry Seinfeld and Elaine Benes (Julia Louis-Dreyfus) that a friend of a friend of his has given him a stock tip, and he encourages them to invest with him. Jerry does so, but as soon as he does, the value of his stock falls. At the same time, Jerry takes his girlfriend on a trip to Vermont, which does not go as planned.

The episode was written by Larry David and Jerry Seinfeld, and was directed by Tom Cherones. It received ratings and praise good enough to commission a second season.

Plot
While dining at Monk's Café, Elaine tells Jerry and George that she is suffering from an allergic reaction to her boyfriend Robert's cats. George reads the business section of the newspaper, where he learns that a stock that a friend of a friend of his—Simons's friend Wilkinson—had tipped him off to had gone up. George invests $5000 in the stock and persuades Jerry to invest $2,500.

Jerry persuades his girlfriend Vanessa (Lynn Clark) to go away with him to a bed-and-breakfast in Vermont. He reads the newspaper in hope that his stock has gone up, but it has in fact fallen in value. The next day, Kramer (Michael Richards) tells Jerry that his stock has fallen again. Jerry calls George to get advice from Wilkinson, but no one can find him. George rings him back and tells Jerry that Wilkinson is in the hospital. Jerry wants to sell his stock, but George insists that the tip is good. George says he will go and visit Wilkinson to find out what they should do, despite the fact that George does not know him personally.

At Jerry's apartment, Elaine says that the only way that she can get rid of Robert's cats is if they should have some form of "accident" and offers Jerry the job, but he refuses. Wilkinson throws George out of the hospital as soon as he mentions Simons, indicating the two had a falling out. Jerry sells his shares, while George decides to "go down with the ship". Jerry takes Vanessa to Vermont, but rainy weather keeps them stuck inside the bed-and-breakfast. He regrets going with her because they have nothing to talk about. Jerry reads the business section of the newspaper to see that the stock has risen dramatically since he sold it. Vanessa then claims that Jerry only took her to that bed-and-breakfast because he lost so much money. Back in New York, George celebrates selling his stock after he had netted a profit of $8,000. Elaine says that she gave Robert an ultimatum, and he chose the cats. George tells Jerry and Elaine that Wilkinson has another stock tip involving some sort of "robot butcher."

Production
"The Stock Tip" was recorded in front of a live studio audience at Ren-Mar Studios in Hollywood, California on March 12, 1990.

This episode contains the first Seinfeld reference to Superman, which would be a recurring feature in later episodes in the series. An earlier draft of the episode featured Jerry arguing that in a nuclear holocaust, when everyone is very depressed, Superman could cheer everyone up with his "super humor". George responded by saying that no one would laugh because they would blame Superman for not stopping the holocaust in the first place.

The character of Vanessa first appeared earlier in season one in the episode "The Stake Out". She is one of only a few of Jerry's girlfriends to appear in more than one episode. According to Larry David, co-writer of the episode, her character returned because there was no mention of any break-up in "The Stake Out", and therefore the characters were still dating. Benjamin Lum, who plays the grocery store worker, reappears as a mail carrier in the season five episode "The Cigar Store Indian".

Reception
When "The Stock Tip" was first broadcast on June 21, 1990, it attracted a Nielsen rating of 13.5/24, meaning that 13.5% of American households watched the episode, and that 24% of all televisions in use at the time were tuned into it. The second season of Seinfeld was commissioned after this episode and a repeat of the pilot episode was broadcast.

Critics praised several elements of the episode, including Jerry's confrontation with the dry cleaner. Colin Jacobson of DVD Movie Guide said that the episode "succeeded in a few ways. For one, it includes DVD One's [The first disc of the 'Seinfeld Seasons 1 & 2' DVD boxset] funniest bit: Jerry's confrontation with a dry cleaner. In addition, the episode offers our first look at a program that tries to branch out substantially beyond just one story. The prior shows went with one overriding plot, but "Tip" indulges equally in the stock and Vanessa elements. It's still not a great show, but it provides some advancement."

David Sims of The A.V. Club gave the episode a B−. He praised the acting, if not the writing: "Kramer's non-specific glee and Jerry's passive frustration at it are both different tones for the characters, and it's fun to see the show play with the archetypes they've already set up. Later on, after Jerry has cashed out with a loss but George hangs on to make a profit, George's incongruous happiness (replete with cigar, suit, and him daintily picking up the check) is equally amusing. But script-wise, it's again apparent that David and Seinfeld are pretty new to the concept of actually sketching out coherent plots... The whole thing kinda just moves along until it isn't moving along anymore. It's not unfunny, and there's some choice dialog, like Jerry and George having the first of many Superman conversations about whether he has super-humor powers."

Steve Schrider wrote, "While neither the strongest nor the second-strongest show of the first season, The Stock Tip proves that the show has come a long way, even after only five episodes. With this first season, the show's main issue is that it didn't equally utilize all four of its main characters... Jerry and Larry are the first to admit that they went into Seinfeld with little to no writing experience, but they were always very good about recognizing weaknesses and addressing them as needed."

References

External links 
 

Seinfeld (season 1) episodes
1990 American television episodes
Television episodes written by Larry David
Television episodes written by Jerry Seinfeld